The 2009 Wimbledon Championships was a tennis tournament played on grass courts at the All England Lawn Tennis and Croquet Club in Wimbledon, London in the United Kingdom. It was the 123rd edition of the Wimbledon Championships and was held from 22 June to 5 July 2009. It was the third Grand Slam tennis event of the year.

Rafael Nadal did not defend his title as he withdrew from the tournament due to knee tendonitis. Roger Federer won his 6th Wimbledon title defeating rival Andy Roddick in the final in five sets. Federer's victory marked his fifteenth Grand Slam title, establishing the men's all-time record. Venus Williams was unsuccessful in the title's defence, having been defeated in the final match by her sister Serena, who won her first Wimbledon title since 2003.

Point and prize money distribution

Point distribution
Below are the tables with the point distribution for each discipline of the tournament.

Senior points

Prize distribution
The total prize money for 2009 championships was £12,550,000. The winner of the men's and women's singles title earned £850,000.

* per team

Champions

Seniors

Men's singles

 Roger Federer def.  Andy Roddick, 5–7, 7–6(8–6), 7–6(7–5), 3–6, 16–14
 It was Federer's 3rd title of the year, and his 60th overall. Federer's victory gave him his 15th career Grand Slam title, to make him the most successful male player in Grand Slam history. Watching the Swiss break the record was Pete Sampras, who won 14 Grand Slam titles and was making his first return to Wimbledon since 2002; Björn Borg, who won five consecutive Wimbledon titles (the only other man doing this being Roger Federer himself); and Rod Laver, who won Wimbledon four times.
 The match set a record for most games in a men's final (77); the most games won by the losing player (39); and, most games won by the winning player (38).

Women's singles

 Serena Williams def.  Venus Williams, 7–6(7–3), 6–2 
 It was Serena's 2nd title of the year, and her 34th overall. It was her 11th career Grand Slam title, and her 3rd Wimbledon title.

Men's doubles

 Daniel Nestor /  Nenad Zimonjić def.  Bob Bryan /  Mike Bryan, 7–6(9–7), 6–7(3–7), 7–6(7–3), 6–3

Women's doubles

 Serena Williams /  Venus Williams def.  Samantha Stosur /  Rennae Stubbs, 7–6(7–4), 6–4

Mixed doubles

 Mark Knowles /  Anna-Lena Grönefeld def.  Leander Paes /  Cara Black, 7–5, 6–3

Juniors

Boys' singles

 Andrey Kuznetsov def.  Jordan Cox, 4–6, 6–2, 6–2

Girls' singles

 Noppawan Lertcheewakarn def.  Kristina Mladenovic, 3–6, 6–3, 6–1

Boys' doubles

 Pierre-Hugues Herbert /  Kevin Krawietz def.  Julien Obry /  Adrien Puget, 6–7(3–7), 6–2, 12–10

Girls' doubles

 Noppawan Lertcheewakarn /  Sally Peers def.  Kristina Mladenovic /  Silvia Njirić, 6–1, 6–1

Invitation

Gentlemen's invitation doubles

 Jacco Eltingh /  Paul Haarhuis def.  Donald Johnson /  Jared Palmer, 7–6(7–2), 6–4

Ladies' invitation doubles

 Martina Navratilova /  Helena Suková def.  Ilana Kloss /   Rosalyn Nideffer, 6–3, 6–2

Senior gentlemen's invitation doubles

 Jeremy Bates /  Anders Järryd def.  Mansour Bahrami /  Henri Leconte, 6–4, 7–6(7–4)

Wheelchair events

Wheelchair men's doubles

 Stéphane Houdet /  Michaël Jérémiasz def.  Robin Ammerlaan /  Shingo Kunieda, 1–6, 6–4, 7–6(7–3)

Wheelchair women's doubles

 Korie Homan /  Esther Vergeer def.  Daniela Di Toro /  Lucy Shuker, 6–1, 6–3

Highlights

Records

Swiss Roger Federer established a number of records at the 2009 Wimbledon Championships. By defeating Ivo Karlović in the quarter-finals, Federer reached his 21st consecutive Grand Slam semi-final, having started the streak at Wimbledon in 2004. He then defeated Tommy Haas in the semi-final to reach his seventh consecutive Wimbledon final and his twentieth Grand Slam final, both of these all-time records. Finally, by defeating Andy Roddick in the final, Federer won his fifteenth Grand Slam title, breaking the record of fourteen titles previously set by Pete Sampras. Federer also became the fourth man to complete the rare French Open / Wimbledon double in the Open Era, joining Rod Laver, Björn Borg, and Rafael Nadal (who had completed the feat the previous year and would do so again in 2010).

Among other records set, the men's final between Federer and Roddick had the highest number of viewers in the UK of any Wimbledon final since 2001, peaking at 11.1 million viewers during the last stretch of the match. The 30-game fifth set in the men's final was the longest set in Wimbledon finals history.

Centre Court roof

The 2009 Championships took place during an extended period of hot, dry weather in southeast England, meaning that it was not until day seven of the tournament (29 June) that the newly constructed Centre Court roof was closed for the first time due to rain, delaying a fourth round match between Amélie Mauresmo and Dinara Safina. The following match between Andy Murray and Stan Wawrinka was the first full match to be played under the new roof; owing to the new floodlights, the match continued until 22:38, the latest ever finish in Wimbledon history (this record was broken in 2012 in a third round match between Andy Murray and Marcos Baghdatis, which ended at 23:02). These were the only two matches in which the Centre Court roof was used during the entire 2009 tournament.

Tennis Integrity Unit
The Tennis Integrity Unit (TIU) planned to observe matches played by up to 12 players (some of whom were inside the ATP top 50) throughout the tournament. The TIU has existed since January 2008.

The ATP claimed to have identified Russian and Italian Mafia-related groups behind suspicious betting at other tournaments, although the organisers of the Wimbledon Championships declared that there are no current proceedings against any players.

Singles players
Men's singles

Women's singles

Day-by-day summaries

Singles seeds
The following are the seeded players and notable players who withdrew from the event. Seedings based on ATP and WTA rankings as of 15 June 2009. Rankings and points before are as of 22 June 2009.

Men's singles
The Men's singles seeds is arranged on a surface-based system to reflect more accurately the individual player's grass court achievement as per the following formula:
ESP points as at a week of 22 June 2009
Add 100% points earned for all grass court tournaments in the past 12 months (23 June 2008 – 21 June 2009)
add 75% points earned for best grass court tournament in the 12 months before that (25 June 2007 – 22 June 2008).

The following players would have been seeded, but they withdrew from the event.

Women's singles
The seeds for ladies' singles are based on the WTA rankings as of 15 June 2009, with an exception for Maria Sharapova (details are given below). Rank and points before are as of 22 June 2009.

† Maria Sharapova was ranked 59th on the day seeds were announced, because she had missed the most of 12-month period due to injury. Nevertheless, she was deemed a special case and was seeded 24th by organizers.

Wild card entries

Main draw wild card entries
The following players received wild cards into the main draw senior events.

Men's singles
  Alex Bogdanovic
  Grigor Dimitrov
  Dan Evans
  Juan Carlos Ferrero
  Josh Goodall
  Nicolas Mahut
  James Ward

Women's singles
  Elena Baltacha
  Kimiko Date-Krumm
  Alexa Glatch
  Michelle Larcher de Brito
  Katie O'Brien
  Laura Robson
  Melanie South
  Georgie Stoop

Men's doubles
  James Auckland /  Josh Goodall
  Alex Bogdanovic /  James Ward
  Jamie Delgado /  Jonathan Marray
  Colin Fleming /  Ken Skupski
  Michaël Llodra /  Nicolas Mahut (Withdrew)

Women's doubles
  Elena Baltacha /  Amanda Elliott
  Jade Curtis /  Anna Smith
  Laura Robson /  Georgie Stoop
  Jocelyn Rae /  Melanie South
  Naomi Cavaday /  Katie O'Brien

Mixed doubles
  James Auckland /  Elena Baltacha
  Alex Bogdanovic /  Melanie South
  Colin Fleming /  Sarah Borwell
  Josh Goodall /  Naomi Cavaday
  Ken Skupski /  Katie O'Brien

Main draw qualifier entries
Below are the lists of the qualifiers entering in the main draws.

Men's singles

Men's singles qualifiers
  Rajeev Ram
  Simon Greul
  Xavier Malisse
  Roko Karanušić
  Lukáš Lacko
  Alexander Peya
  Alejandro Falla
  Édouard Roger-Vasselin
  Grega Žemlja
  Santiago González
  Taylor Dent
  Riccardo Ghedin
  Adrian Mannarino
  Luka Gregorc
  Michael Yani
  Jesse Levine

Lucky Losers
  Karol Beck
  Thiago Alves
  Danai Udomchoke
  Pablo Cuevas

Women's singles

Women's singles qualifiers
  Viktoriya Kutuzova
  Klára Zakopalová
  Tatjana Malek
  Aiko Nakamura
  Arantxa Parra Santonja
  Sesil Karatantcheva
  Regina Kulikova
  Melanie Oudin
  Alberta Brianti
  Neuza Silva
  Vesna Manasieva
  Anastasija Sevastova

Lucky Losers
  Kristína Kučová

Men's doubles

Men's doubles qualifiers
  Chris Eaton /  Alexander Slabinsky
  Santiago González /  Travis Rettenmaier
  Kevin Anderson /  Somdev Devvarman
  Prakash Amritraj /  Aisam-ul-Haq Qureshi

Lucky Losers
  Rameez Junaid /  Philipp Marx
  David Martin /  Jean-Claude Scherrer
  Alessandro Motti /  Joseph Sirianni
  Sanchai Ratiwatana /  Sonchat Ratiwatana
  Karol Beck /  Jaroslav Levinský
  Chris Guccione /  Frank Moser

Women's doubles

Women's doubles qualifiers
  Tatjana Malek /  Andrea Petkovic
  Rika Fujiwara /  Aiko Nakamura
  Edina Gallovits /  Katalin Marosi
  Yuliana Fedak /  Mervana Jugić-Salkić

Protected ranking
The following players were accepted directly into the main draw using a protected ranking: 

Men's Singles
  Stefan Koubek
  Andrei Pavel

Women's Singles
  Akiko Morigami
  Tatiana Perebiynis

Withdrawals

Men's Singles
  Mario Ančić → replaced by  Frank Dancevic
  Marcos Baghdatis → replaced by  Karol Beck
  Richard Gasquet → replaced by  Benjamin Becker
  Ivan Ljubičić → replaced by  Danai Udomchoke
  Gaël Monfils → replaced by  Pablo Cuevas
  Carlos Moyá → replaced by  Vince Spadea
  Rafael Nadal → replaced by  Thiago Alves
  David Nalbandian → replaced by  Brian Dabul
  Jarkko Nieminen → replaced by  Nicolás Lapentti

Women's Singles
  Marina Erakovic → replaced by  Stéphanie Dubois
  Laura Granville → replaced by  Maša Zec Peškirič
  Meghann Shaughnessy → replaced by  Raluca Olaru
  Katarina Srebotnik → replaced by  Kristína Kučová

References

External links

 Official Wimbledon Championships website